The 2015 Northern Iowa Panthers football team represented the University of Northern Iowa in the 2015 NCAA Division I FCS football season. The team is coached by Mark Farley in his 15th season and played their home games in the UNI-Dome. They were a member of the Missouri Valley Football Conference. They finished the season 9–5, 5–3 in MVFC play to finish in a three–way tie for second place. They received an at-large bid to the FCS Playoffs where they defeated Eastern Illinois in the first round and Portland State in the second round before losing in the quarterfinals to North Dakota State.

Personnel

Roster
2015 Roster

Coaching staff

Season

Schedule

 Source: Schedule

Ranking movements

References

Northern Iowa
Northern Iowa Panthers football seasons
Northern Iowa
Northern Iowa Panthers football